Chamberlain Basin is a drainage basin that contains a chain of ten alpine and glacial Paternoster lakes in Custer County, Idaho, United States, located in the White Cloud Mountains in the Sawtooth National Recreation Area.  Lakes are located on the upper portion of Chamberlain Creek in the Germania Creek watershed, a tributary of the East Fork Salmon River.  Castle Peak, the highest summit in the White Cloud Mountains, rises to the east and north of Chamberlain Basin. Sawtooth National Forest trail 047 crosses the basin, although most people begin their trips at the Fourth of July Creek trailhead.  Individual lakes do not have official names and are listed from lowest to highest elevation.

See also

List of lakes of the White Cloud Mountains
Sawtooth National Forest
Sawtooth National Recreation Area
White Cloud Mountains

References

Lakes of Idaho
Lakes of Custer County, Idaho
Glacial lakes of the United States
Glacial lakes of the Sawtooth National Forest